Thomas Skoglund (born 3 March 1983) is a Norwegian handball player, playing for the Danish club GOG Svendborg.

He started his club career in Fet, and later played for Haslum.

He made his debut on the Norwegian national team in 2004, and has played 41 matches and scored 84 goals.

References
Profile at the Norwegian Handball Association (Retrieved on 4 August 2008)

1983 births
Living people
Norwegian male handball players
People from Lillestrøm
Sportspeople from Viken (county)